Cebeci Sport Hall is an indoor multi-purpose sport venue that is located in the Sultangazi, Istanbul, Turkey. The hall, with a capacity for 1,250 spectators, was built in 2012. It is home to İstanbul BB, which plays currently in the Turkish Basketball League.

References

Sports venues completed in 2012
Indoor arenas in Turkey
Basketball venues in Turkey
Turkish Basketball League venues